To Create a Cure is the debut album by American heavy metal band My Ticket Home. It was released on January 21, 2012, through Rise Records. It is the last to feature Luke Fletcher on bass and Sean Mackowski on guitar and vocals.

Track listing

Personnel
My Ticket Home
 Nick Giumenti – unclean vocals
 Sean Mackowski – guitars, clean vocals
 Matt Gallucci – guitars
 Luke Fletcher - bass
 Marshal Giumenti – drums

Production
 Caleb Shomo - production, mixing, keyboards, programming
 My Ticket Home - production

References

2012 debut albums
My Ticket Home albums
Rise Records albums